Abuja Agreement or Abuja Accord may refer to:
 Abuja Accord (Liberia), a peace treaty signed 19 August 1995 in an attempt to end the Liberian Civil War
 Abuja Agreement (Sierra Leone), a series of treaties were signed in Sierra Leone marking an end to the Sierra Leone Civil War in 2000 and 2001 
 Abuja Agreement (Sudan), the 2006 Abuja Agreement of the Darfur Peace Agreement
 See United Nations Peacebuilding Support Office in Guinea-Bissau for Abuja Accord, 1998
 Abuja Treaty, an international agreement signed on June 3, 1991, in Abuja, Nigeria